Pavlos Grigoriadis (27 May 1938 – 24 November 2007) was a Greek football striker and later manager.

References

1938 births
2007 deaths
Greek footballers
Super League Greece players
Doxa Drama F.C. players
Olympiacos F.C. players
Greece international footballers
Association football forwards
Greek football managers
Pierikos F.C. managers
Kastoria F.C. managers
P.A.S. Korinthos managers
Panserraikos F.C. managers
Olympiacos F.C. managers
Ionikos F.C. managers
People from Drama (regional unit)
Footballers from Eastern Macedonia and Thrace